Prudencio Ortiz de Rozas (April 28, 1800 – June 1, 1857) was an Argentine general, brother of governor Juan Manuel de Rosas. He fought at the Battle of Márquez Bridge and San José de Flores, and took part in the agreements of Rosas and Juan Lavalle in Cañuelas and Barracas. He took part in the battle of Chascomús, that defeated the Freemen of the South.

References 

Argentine generals
Juan Manuel de Rosas
Federales (Argentina)
1800 births
1857 deaths